Potassium hydride, KH, is the inorganic compound of potassium and hydrogen. It is an alkali metal hydride. It is a white solid, although commercial samples appear gray. It is a powerful superbase that is useful in organic synthesis. It is sold commercially as a slurry (~35%) in mineral oil or sometimes paraffin wax to facilitate dispensing.

Preparation
Potassium hydride is produced by direct combination of the metal and hydrogen:

This reaction was discovered by Humphry Davy soon after his 1807 discovery of potassium, when he noted that the metal would vaporize in a current of hydrogen when heated just below its boiling point.

Potassium hydride is soluble in fused hydroxides (such as molten sodium hydroxide) and salt mixtures, but not in organic solvents.

Reactions
KH reacts with water according to the reaction:

As a superbase, potassium hydride is more basic than sodium hydride. It is used to deprotonate certain carbonyl compounds to give enolates.

Safety
KH can be pyrophoric in air, react violently with acids, and can ignite upon contact with oxidants. As a suspension in mineral oil, KH is less dangerous.

See also
 Sodium hydride

References

Metal hydrides
Potassium compounds
Superbases
Rock salt crystal structure